This Could Be Heartbreak is the fifth studio album by Australian metalcore band the Amity Affliction. The album was released through Roadrunner Records on 12 August 2016. It is the first album without guitarist and founding member Troy Brady, following his departure in 2014. It is also the last album to feature drummer Ryan Burt after his departure in early 2018.

Track listing

Personnel
The Amity Affliction
Joel Birch – lead vocals
Ahren Stringer – co-lead vocals, bass
Dan Brown – guitars, backing vocals
Ryan Burt – drums, percussion

Additional personnel
Ursula Kurasik – piano and additional string arrangements

Charts

Weekly charts

Year-end charts

References

2016 albums
The Amity Affliction albums
Roadrunner Records albums
UNFD albums
Albums produced by Will Putney